

List of Ambassadors

Ifat Reshef 2021 - 
Jacob Keidar 2016 - 
Yigal Baruch Caspi 2012 - 2016
Ilan Elgar 2006 - 2011
Aviv Shir-On 2003 - 2006
Yigal Antebi (diplomat) 2001 - 2003
Yitzhak Mayer 1997 - 2001
Rafael Gvir 1991 - 1995
Yehuda Horam 1988 - 1991
David Rivlin 1985 - 1988
Yohanan Meroz 1983 - 1985
Matitiahu Adler1980 - 1983
Yaacov Shimoni 1976 - 1979 
Shmuel Bentsur 1962 - 1967
Mesholam Veron 1961 - 1962
Joseph Ivor Linton 1958-1961 
Minister Yeshayahu Aviad 1956
Minister Shmuel Tolkowsky 1951 - 1956 (Consul General 1949 - 1951)

Consulate (Zürich)
Consul General Yitzhak Mayer 1979
Consul General Gavriel Gavrieli 1976 - 1979

References

Switzerland
Israel